Rahmatabad (also Romanized as Raḩmatābād; also known as Āzādegān and Raḩmatābād-e Āzādegān) is a village in Aspas Rural District, Sedeh District, Eqlid County, Fars Province, Iran. At the 2006 census, its population was 548, in 128 families.

References 

Populated places in Eqlid County